Rita de Luna (born 1 September 1929) is a Guatemalan equestrian. She competed in the individual eventing at the 1976 Summer Olympics.

References

1929 births
Living people
Guatemalan female equestrians
Olympic equestrians of Guatemala
Equestrians at the 1976 Summer Olympics
Place of birth missing (living people)